Parves-et-Nattages is a commune in the Ain department of eastern France. The municipality was established on January 1, 2016 and consists of the former communes of Parves and Nattages.

See also 
Communes of the Ain department

References 

Communes of Ain
Communes nouvelles of Ain
Populated places established in 2016
2016 establishments in France